</noinclude>
Loki Laufeyson is a character appearing in American comic books published by Marvel Comics. Created by writer Stan Lee, scripter Larry Lieber, and penciller Jack Kirby, the character first appeared in Venus #6 (August 1949), although the characterization that has persisted to the modern day debuted in Journey into Mystery #85 (October 1962). The character, which is based on the Norse deity of the same name, is the Asgardian "God of Mischief," the adopted son of Odin and the adopted brother of the superhero Thor. Loki has been portrayed as both a supervillain and antihero.

Loki has appeared in several ongoing series, limited series and alternate reality series, including the 4-issue series Loki in 2004 and 2006, being the main character of Journey into Mystery from issues 622 to 645, appearing in new issues of Young Avengers in 2013 and receiving three more solo series, Loki: Agent of Asgard in 2013, Vote Loki in 2016 and Loki in 2019. The character has also appeared in associated Marvel merchandise including animated television series, films, video games, clothing, and toys.

Tom Hiddleston plays the character in the Marvel Cinematic Universe films Thor (2011), The Avengers (2012), Thor: The Dark World (2013), Thor: Ragnarok (2017), Avengers: Infinity War (2018), and portraying alternate timeline versions of the character in Avengers: Endgame (2019), Ant-Man and the Wasp: Quantumania (2023), and the series Loki (2021) and  What If...? (2021).

Publication history

A version of Loki made his first Marvel Comics appearance in Timely Comics' publication Venus No. 6 (August 1949), where Loki was depicted as a member of the Olympian gods exiled to the Underworld, and here resembled the traditional image of the Devil. Planning to spread hate, he convinced Jupiter to let him travel to the realm of Earth, using Venus already being allowed onto it as his justification. Venus pledged herself to Loki's service in order to stop his plans, with Jupiter seeing her unselfish act and freeing her from the pledge, with Loki subsequently being sent back to the Underworld. The modern-age Loki made his first official Marvel appearance in Journey into Mystery #85 (Oct. 1962), where Loki was reintroduced as Thor's sworn enemy. The modern age Loki was introduced by brothers and co-writers Stan Lee and Larry Lieber and was redesigned by Jack Kirby.

As one of Thor's arch-nemeses, Loki has frequently made appearances in Thor-related titles like Journey into Mystery and Thor, as well as other Marvel Universe titles such as The Avengers and X-Men. As well as brief appearances in the Spider-Man and The Defenders comic series, he was the starring character in two four-issue miniseries Loki in 2004 and 2010.

Loki played a key role in the 2010s company-wide Siege storyline, in which the character is eventually killed.

Starting with issue #622 the ongoing series Thor reverted to the original title Journey into Mystery and shifted focus to Loki. Under the pen of Kieron Gillen, Loki is resurrected but exists in a child's body, remaining the main character from 2011 to 2012, his final issue as lead being #645.

Gillen, joined by penciller Jamie McKelvie, continued his Loki storyline by introducing Loki, still as Kid Loki, as a main character in the second Young Avengers, which began in 2013. In issue #11, he manipulated Wiccan into restoring him to his teenaged form.

A solo series for Loki called Loki: Agent of Asgard was announced for 2014. Writer Al Ewing said that among other things, the series would explore Loki's bisexuality and fluid gender identity, writing "Loki is bi and I'll be touching on that. [He will be] shift[ing] between genders occasionally as well."

Another solo series for Loki called Vote Loki started in 2016. In this series Loki decides to run in the US presidential election, but loses seemingly after his tricks are uncovered by the media; he is later revealed to have lost intentionally on behalf of the then-winning candidate.

Fictional character biography
Many years ago, when Bor, ruler of Asgard, was battling frost giants, he followed a wounded giant to a powerful sorcerer that was waiting for him. The sorcerer caught him unaware, turning Bor into snow. Bor's son, Odin, found his father as he was blowing away; Bor begged Odin to find a sorcerer to free him, but Odin made no attempt to save his father. Bor cursed Odin saying that he would take in the son of a fallen king and raise it as his own. Not a week later, Odin himself led the Asgardians into battle against the Frost Giants and killed Laufey, who was the King, in personal combat. After slaying Laufey, Odin found a small Asgardian-sized child hidden within the primary stronghold of the Frost Giants. The child was Loki; Laufey having kept him hidden from the Frost Giant people due to his shame over his son's small size. Odin took the child, out of a combination of pity, to appease the memory of his father, and because he was the child of a worthy adversary slain in honorable combat, and raised as his own alongside his biological son Thor.

Throughout his childhood and into adolescence, Loki was resentful of the differences between how Thor and himself were treated by the citizens of Asgard. The Asgardians valued great strength, tenacity, and bravery in battle above all things, and Loki was clearly inferior to his brother Thor in those areas. What he lacked in size and strength, however, he made up for in power and skill, particularly as a sorcerer. As Loki grew to adulthood, his natural talent for causing mischief would make itself manifest and earned him a nickname as the "God of Mischief"; his mischievousness eventually became malice as his hunger for power and revenge grew stronger. Several times he tried to use tricks to get rid of Thor, such as telling him to guard a hole in the wall that he himself had made. In time, his reputation grew from being a playful and mischievous trickster to the "God of Evil". Over the centuries, Loki attempted on many occasions to seize the rulership of Asgard and to destroy Thor, even helping the Storm Giant Ghan to escape Thor planning to get a debt from him later, and aided other enemies of Asgard, planning to take over. Odin, who had grown weary of Loki's mischief, magically imprisoned him within a tree until someone would shed a tear for his plight. Loki eventually freed himself by causing a leaf to strike Heimdall, the guardian of Bifrost, in the eye, which made him shed a tear. Loki compiled an extensive criminal record in Asgard, and was frequently exiled. He later met the Sorcerer Eldred, who taught him black magic, repaying Eldred by later giving him to the Fire demon Surtur.

Battles with Earth's heroes
Loki's schemes eventually came to include Earth itself, and often fought with Earth's superhuman heroes to take their planet, and often Asgard itself. He first battled Thor on Earth in modern times after escaping from the tree; Loki then manipulated the Hulk into wreaking havoc using an illusion of dynamite on train tracks, while in astral form in an attempt to lure Thor to Earth, which inadvertently led to the formation of the Avengers as several other heroes came to meet the Hulk.

Thor was one of the founding members of this superhuman team, and often led them into battle against Loki. Several times Loki, while not directly battling Thor, caused other threats for Thor to battle, like increasing the mental powers of a carnival fortune teller Sandu, making him powerful enough to lift buildings with his mind, and releasing a Lava Man called Molto by accident when causing a long-dead volcano to explode. When Loki convinced Odin to punish Thor, Odin took away half of Thor's power, after which Loki returned the memory of the 23rd-century villain Zarrko. Zarrko defeated Thor and took him back to help conquer his time period, although the God of Thunder was able to finally capture the villain. Loki even released Mr. Hyde and Cobra by paying their bail, then doubled their powers. Loki told them to kidnap Jane Foster, which he knew would attract Thor's attention, but Hyde and Cobra were again defeated. Loki finally went after Jane Foster himself, sending her to another dimension. However Doctor Strange was able to protect her, and Thor forced Loki to return her.

Among Loki's better-known henchmen was the human criminal Carl "The Crusher" Creel, whom Loki transformed into the superhuman criminal known as the Absorbing Man. Creel would prove to be a formidable adversary to Thor and other Avengers over the years. Loki went so far as to attempt to turn Odin against Thor and to steal Thor's enchanted hammer Mjolnir in an attempt to attain freedom, but his efforts failed. Upon convincing Odin to go to Earth and leave him in charge of Asgard with part of the Odinforce, he released Skagg, the largest Storm Giant, and Surtur, the largest Fire Demon, to try to destroy Odin. However, Thor and Balder helped defeat the monsters, and Loki was sent to serve the Trolls. Loki was responsible for the Destroyer being awakened, by leading a Hunter to the Temple where the Destroyer armor resided using their mental abilities while Thor was nearby, causing the soul of the Hunter to animate the armor, but Thor forced the Hunter to return to his body, then buried the armor under thousands of tons of rock. The Absorbing Man was brought back to Earth by Loki, and battled Thor, but Loki quickly took him to Asgard when Thor was on the verge of defeating them. The Absorbing Man defeated the Asgardians without too much trouble and absorbed Odin's attacks. However Loki and the Absorbing Man were exiled into space due to a trick by Odin, then sending his astral form back to Earth and taking over the Destroyer armor, attempting to take over Asgard; Odin then sent Balder to discover the location of Loki, then using his powers to send Loki out of the Destroyer armor.

Taking over Asgard
Loki's destiny to be the cause of Ragnarök was later recounted. Loki returned from exile in space, but was then stripped of his powers and exiled to Earth by Odin. Loki plotted to gain new powers from Karnilla; however, this accidentally created the Wrecker, who gained Asgardian powers upon being mistaken for Loki after knocking him out and putting on his helmet just before Karnilla appeared in response to Loki's ritual. He almost killed Thor by collapsing a building on him, as Thor had been stripped of all his powers except his strength by Odin. Loki then fomented a battle between Thor and the Destroyer animated by Sif. Loki then took command of Asgard during the Odinsleep, using his right as the 'son' of Odin before Thor could claim it, but fled when Asgard was invaded by Mangog, realizing that this new foe was too powerful.

Loki later usurped the throne of Asgard by taking the Odinring, but fled again when Asgard was invaded by Surtur. Subsequently, he attempted to destroy Thor by switching bodies with him, granting him Thor's raw strength against his own inexperienced use of magic in Thor's hands; regardless, Thor was able to regain his true appearance by tricking Loki into throwing Mjolnir away so that it became stuck in a cliff, causing Thor's (Loki's) body to return to the human form of Donald Blake and allowing Thor to regain control of his true form. Much later, Loki usurped the throne of Asgard again and set the Destroyer against Thor once more. Shortly after that, Loki caused the temporary death of Balder using mistletoe, having conspired with Hela to cause Ragnarök if his last plan had failed. At this time, Loki's estranged wife Sigyn returned to Asgard. When Loki was chained and a viper dripped poison on his face as punishment for killing Balder, Sigyn tried helping him. Loki attempted to bring about Ragnarök, but was foiled by Odin. Alongside Tyr and his forces, Loki stole the golden apples of Idunna and invaded Asgard with help from the Midgard serpent, but then changed sides and aided Odin's forces in defeating Tyr.

Despite Loki's seeming hatred of his adoptive brother and father, Loki helped to defend Asgard from destruction from Surtur and his fire demons. This was because Surtur's goal was to destroy Asgard, whereas Loki sought only to rule it. Alongside Odin and Thor, Loki battled Surtur, and witnessed the seeming demise of Odin. Not long after that, Loki transformed Thor into a frog for a time, using the Twilight Sword. Thor was turned back when Volstagg destroyed one of the machines Loki had used to transform Thor. He then involved the X-Men and Alpha Flight in a plot to gain favor with "Those Who Sit Above in Shadow" by trying to prove that he could do a truly good deed by offering to grant the wishes of the two teams—such as giving Puck a normal body while granting Rogue the ability to touch again—but failed the test after trying to force the gifts on the heroes after they rejected them, the two teams learning that these enhanced powers—and the further powers that Loki would grant to the world—would deprive those who received the gifts of the ability to imagine and create new things, essentially destroying what it meant to be human.

Acts of Vengeance
In disguise, Loki manipulated a group of master villains into engineering the "Acts of Vengeance". With these prime movers, he set into motion a plot against the Avengers and other heroes, sending the Juggernaut against Thor, and casting a spell that caused temporary bouts of weakness in Thor. He then battled the combined forces of the West Coast and East Coast Avengers. His identity and role in the proceedings was ultimately revealed, and he was then defeated by the Avengers. Loki would actually die at the hands of Thor, although manipulation of the time stream would later bring him back. During this time, Loki briefly travelled to the dimension of the Ultraverse to seek out the Infinity Gems.

Lady Loki
Morwen, a powerful agent of chaos, was released and took Tessa Black, a daughter of Loki from his female form, as a host. With Doctor Strange unavailable, Loki and Spider-Man work together to free her. Loki proclaims that he owes an as-of-yet unpaid debt to his temporary ally.

A short while later, Loki was prophesied to lead Asgard's enemies into destroying the "Eternal Realm" in a final conflict known as Ragnarök, part of the continuing Asgardian cycle of the birth, life, and death presided over by beings known as "Those Who Sit Above in Shadow" who drew sustenance from the energies expended during these cycles. In the final confrontation between the brothers before that battle, Thor hung Loki's head from his belt so he could watch the final moments of the battle.

After Ragnarök, Loki returned in a female body working with Doctor Doom so Thor would unwittingly resurrect his Asgardian enemies and manipulated Balder to make him the new successor to the throne of Asgard. Secretly, Loki additionally retained his male form, carrying Thor's reborn lover Sif within himself as his daughter. During this period, Hela and Loki used magic to send Loki to the past to cause the events that led to his younger self being adopted by Odin as a means to eliminate Bor, Thor's grandfather.

During the Secret Invasion, Loki goaded the Asgardians into believing Beta Ray Bill was a Skrull, but Thor showed that Loki was lying. After the Skrulls were defeated, he joined the Cabal, consisting of himself, Norman Osborn, Emma Frost, Doctor Doom, Namor, and the Hood, so Osborn could launch his new world order, promising Loki that he could Restore Asgard back to the heavens where it belonged. Loki and Sif are soon restored to their respective bodies and following the Hood's depowerment, Loki offers him a second chance.

Mighty Avengers

The Scarlet Witch appeared in her astral form recruiting a team of Avengers to face the Elder God Chthon. It was soon revealed that Wanda was Loki in disguise. The Avengers, unaware of Loki's trick, followed the false "Wanda's" instructions. Her goal was to throw Norman Osborn off-balance, as shown during the second meeting of the Cabal. After Thor was banished due to her trickery, Loki intended to put "cracks in Osborn's armor" and gradually "widen" these cracks through the Mighty Avengers. Pietro Maximoff, desiring to see and converse with his sister, joined the Mighty Avengers. He raced around the world searching for her, not knowing that his nephews Billy and Tommy had just done so and also failed to find her.

However, Loki had planned on the deaths of Pietro and Cassandra Lang, fearing they may form wedges in his plans. Cutting off communications from the former, they tried to convince Hank Pym to expel Cassie after placing a spell on her to prevent her from saying anything bad about their disguise. The latter, however, invited her fellow Young Avengers into the Infinite Avengers Mansion (an extension of the PymPocket), to prove that the Scarlet Witch was evil. When Wiccan cast a spell to bring Scarlet Witch to them, Loki appeared as Scarlet Witch and stated that Cassandra Lang sealed their fate. Just then, Ronin appeared and ambushed the "Scarlet Witch". He determined that she was not Wanda by kissing her and stating that the real Scarlet Witch would have used her power to revive Cassandra's father. Wiccan then chanted a spell to reveal Loki's true form. Afraid of exposure, Loki was forced to leave, swearing all their deaths. The continued achievements of the Mighty Avengers strained Osborn to the breaking point. Loki decided to play the final card that would break Osborn by unleashing the Absorbing Man, who had absorbed the power of the Cosmic Cube. In the Dark Avengers, Loki secreted himself inside Norman Osborn's office in his female form, manipulating Osborn into becoming the Green Goblin again, as Siege begins.

Siege

Loki was present at the Cabal when Norman Osborn denied to bring Namor to Doctor Doom. When the Doombot posing as Doctor Doom unleashed insect-like robots, Loki advised the Hood to take flight. Following Osborn's talk with the President, Loki advised to recreate an incident similar to the Stamford Incident that would bring about the invasion upon Asgard.

He then revealed a plot to Osborn that would take advantage of Volstagg's presence in Chicago. Since Volstagg had gone for adventures like Thor, the U-Foes could attack him and destroy a packed Soldier Field during an American football game, killing thousands while Osborn and he watched in astral form. Loki then warned Balder about Osborn's impending attack on Asgard, claiming that he had tried to convince Osborn not to attack. killing the Asgardian who actually prophesied the attack and sending Heimdall's chamber beneath Asgard so he could not warn the Asgardians in time. Loki, when Osborn called out for his aid, sent the Hood and his diminished syndicate as reinforcements to help Osborn's forces against the Avengers. Loki later appeared to Balder, telling him that he would have simply pardoned Thor instead of banishing him if he had not wanted the throne of Asgard for himself. Balder later banished Loki from Asgard.

Sometime after, he magically disguised himself as Osborn's Green Goblin persona to lay siege to Asgard, Loki encountered the Disir (the Valkyries of Bor) after he lured them using several wandering god's souls he imprisoned as bait, revealing that he desired to gain their service as his slaves. The 13 Disir unite and assault him as one, but Loki managed to defeat them using extraordinary swordsmanship skills, thus forcing them to submit to him and declare him the victor. Loki meets with Hela and asks her what she will give him in exchange for a new Hel, to which she answers 'Anything.' She then met with Mephisto, demonstrating the power of the Disir and agreeing to lend him the Disir for a hundred and one days in exchange for the demon lord granting a portion of his netherworld to Hela for one thousand and one years, as her new "Hel", which Mephisto agrees to. In exchange for this, Hela erased Loki from the Books of Hel, thus, he was no longer tied to Hel or Asgard, gaining absolute freedom. Mephisto asked Loki why he had resorted to such schemes, to which Loki replied it was more fun this way.

When the combined forces of the New Avengers, Young Avengers, and the Secret Warriors defeated the Dark Avengers, Thor demanded to know where Loki was. Norman Osborn could only tell him that he was dead, just like "the rest of them" as the true form of the Void appeared. As the creature tore apart the three teams, Loki began to repent, realizing that what had happened to Asgard was not what he wanted, begging his father, Odin, to return to him the Norn Stones (which were previously taken away from the Hood and given to the trickster), using their power to empower the three teams and give the powers of the Hood's gang to them to fight back against the Void. However, the Void sensed Loki's hand in this and attacked him, the stones having not affected the Void directly. As Loki was torn apart by the Void's tendrils in front of a shocked Thor, his last words were to apologize to his brother. Thor resolved to avenge his fallen brother and destroyed the Void and the Sentry with a lightning strike. He took the Sentry's remains into outer space, and released them into the Sun.

Reincarnation

Thor, missing his brother, searched for Loki who had returned to life in the form of a young boy; as due to his schemes his name was removed from the Book of Hell, allowing him to permanently cheat death. Now located in Paris, France, Loki was a street hustler going by the name of Serrure (the French word for lock), who feigned simple card tricks in front of an audience while an accomplice pickpocketed them. Thor, in civilian disguise, gave chase, resulting in the restoration of Loki's memory, but not of his past life with the exception of a guilty conscience for things he cannot remember. With nothing to lose, Loki followed Thor, who restored part of his identity to him (though he remained in the form of a child), and asked when precisely Thor got so old, to which Thor smiled. Thor took Loki to the remains of Asgard, where plans were made to help the refugees of the World Tree. With the resurrection of Odin, Loki was frightened away and fled with Thor, who lambasted Odin for scaring him away. Running into Iron Man, Loki was saved by Thor, who defended his own reasons for bringing the trickster back.

Journey into Mystery
With the Asgardian population other than Thor still wary of Loki, Loki revealed to his brother that he was attempting to learn more about Earth and humans, to which Thor approves. When a magpie exploded in his quarters carrying a key, it led to a chain of events where at the end, Loki was contacted by an echo of his former incarnation, who revealed he chose to sacrifice himself fighting the Void as part of a greater plan which would involve his death and return. The child Loki refused to follow this path, wanting to be his own person, and transformed the spirit of his former self into a magpie named Ikol. On returning to Earth, he witnessed Odin striking down Thor.

Odin prepared all of Asgard for an unknown battle and imprisoned Thor for attempting to protect Midgard from being scoured. Loki, who disagreed with Odin's actions, was put to work by Volstagg into cleaning the stables of Thor's goats to keep him out of trouble and danger. Using the wool of one of the goats, Loki descended into the roots of the world tree at the advice of Ikol to ask questions from the Nornish women who live there. After receiving answers, Loki wept but decided to turn to the imprisoned Thor for his opinion before making his final decision. Breaking into the prison by stealth, Loki asked his brother what he would do if he had to let something bad happen in order to prevent something worse from happening, and what if it cost him everything. With Thor's answer, Loki decided to free one of the imprisoned Hel Wolves and bind it to him in servitude using the bridle of Thor's goats, then revealing he would need help from one more 'personage' before heading for the realm of Hela.

Having recovered Thor's hammer after Thor had been killed and erased from memory following the war against the Serpent, Loki was able to work with the Silver Surfer to restore the hammer to its natural state and send it to Thor in the afterlife, restoring his memory and allowing him to fight his way back into the realm of the living. After Thor's return, Ikol would afterward reveal that circumstances had been manipulated to force the young Loki to allow his former personality to subsume him and live again, his former slate wiped clean by the "new" Loki's actions. During his adventures, the young Loki had inadvertently helped create and was tied to a powerful artifact that was about to be used by Mephisto to conquer all the Hells and ultimately everything. However, if the new Loki ceased to be, the artifact would lose all power. Seeing no other option, Loki allowed Ikol to become Loki again, ceasing to be, but warning beforehand that the Ikol personality was incapable of true change and believing this older persona would ultimately be stopped by those who always stopped him before, his brother included, imbuing him with his experiences. Horrified at what he had become and done to his former self, the new Loki breaks down, screaming "I am the crime that will not be forgiven!".

Young Avengers
Kid Loki joined the Young Avengers in the 2013 relaunch of the series as part of Marvel NOW!. When Wiccan and Hulkling are captured by an interdimensional parasite known as Mother, Loki comes to their aid and rescues them from the prison that they were being held in. They admit that they need help to defeat the creature, but are wary of trusting Loki, knowing who he is. They go to Asgard, and are met with Loki's father. With the help of Miss America, the team flee to New York City, but are once again met by the parasite, and are captured. They are saved by Kate Bishop and Noh-Varr, but they are then attacked by citizens of New York City who fall under the control of Mother as the team flies by in Noh-Var's ship. The team flees to Central Park in order to minimize the number of civilians in the area. Once there, Loki tells the group that their only choice to save themselves is to either kill Wiccan, or allow Loki to borrow Wiccan's powers for ten minutes so that he can save them. Seeing no other option, Wiccan agrees, and Loki immediately teleports away, seemingly abandoning the group to face the mob of mind-controlled New Yorkers on his own.

While he originally intended to leave them to die, Loki has an internal conversation with his child self (that still exists within him) whom he killed at the end of Journey into Mystery, and is convinced to return to the team. Once there, he defeats the creature, but the team is forced to leave New York, as Wiccan's spell is still intact. While the rest of the team is busy, Loki meets with Mother, revealing that he had planned everything that had happened with the parasite, working in order to gain access to Wiccan's immense power so that he can gain back the abilities he lost when he was reincarnated.

The team is left in a situation where neither Wiccan nor Loki are powerful enough to fight Mother. In order to increase Loki's power, Wiccan ages Loki's body to that of a teenager, increasing his powers. Now able to take on Mother, as well as Leah, who had recruited the exes of the other Young Avengers members, the group goes to Mother's dimension to stop things once and for all. In his confrontation with Leah, she taunts him for destroying his younger self. Realizing that she is merely an illusion created by his own guilty conscience, Loki confesses his part in freeing Mother, as well as for killing his younger self. Now sated, the exes and Leah vanish, allowing the Young Avengers to defeat Mother. When Wiccan turns to introduce his teammate to his parents, he finds that Loki is missing, having fled the scene wracked with guilt over his actions. Later, when the team throws a New Year's party, Prodigy sees Loki watching them and confronts him, only to find out that Loki supplied the money behind the party. Loki admits that if he came back, the team would probably forgive him, and therefore he will not show himself, feeling unworthy of their forgiveness. After briefly making a pass at Prodigy, Loki appears to teleport away. As the party ends and the team leaves, Loki looks on fondly at a photo of himself with the team.

Agent of Asgard
In a mission for the All-Mother, Loki traveled from space to Midgard in order to collect five keys Odin had once forged for him should he be worthy. Using his sorcery and wits, Loki used the keys to claim Gram, the sword of Sigurd, as his own. He also befriended a human, Verity Willis, with the power to always know if she is being lied to. She and Loki develop a great friendship, and through him she develops friendships with Sigurd and Lorelei, while Loki continues to run missions for the All-Mother. He later discovers that he is being manipulated by King Loki, his villainous and depraved future self, who is much the same as the old Loki was before his death and resurrection. While Loki fears one day becoming King Loki, he also knows that his future self is determined to make it happen.

During the AXIS storyline, Loki appears as a member of Magneto's unnamed superhero group during the fight against Red Skull's Red Onslaught form. A spell by Scarlet Witch and Doctor Doom inadvertently causes a wave which inverts the moralities of all the heroes and villains present. With his basic morality inverted, Loki becomes romantically involved with Amora the Enchantress, although soon finds that his inverted morality is not as straightforward as for the other villains. While before Loki was devious but likeable, Verity quickly sees the new Loki is pious, priggish, and while 'good', disloyal to a fault; he betrays Lorelei and Sigurd to the returned All-Father, Odin, knowing full well that Odin will punish their small crime with a heinous overblown punishment. Later, in the final battle of AXIS, Loki fights his brother (whose morality is also inverted) on the moon, and to their surprise, Loki is able to lift Thor's hammer and beat him with it. His triumph, and feeling of great power and accomplishment, is short-lived; Scarlet Witch's second inversion wave restores Loki and Thor's original moral 'axes'. The hammer drops from Loki's hand, and the scream of the Kid Loki whom he killed is heard for miles, bellowing 'I am the crime that cannot be forgiven'. The effects of Scarlet Witch's spell are seen again later; Loki can no longer tell a lie. In a heart to heart with Thor, he finds himself compelled to admit what happened: that he, as Ikol, murdered the sweet reborn Loki and took his chance at life away. Thor, now seeing Loki not as his brother but as a murderous creature that stole his brother's shot at life, surrenders Loki to Asgard for justice at the hands of their people.

After Freyja banishes Loki from Asgard, he finds himself on Earth, where King Loki and Verity are. King Loki tells Verity of the awful things Loki did during his time with the Young Avengers, and she flees, not wanting to have to deal with him anymore. King Loki then ties up his younger self and starts telling them why he has done all this. As it turns out, in King Loki's future, Loki did complete his duty as Asgard's agent, clearing all of his horrible deeds from his name. However, he was still viewed as nothing more than the God of Lies, and, being unable to take it anymore, once again became an enemy of Thor; an unknown amount of time later, King Loki destroys the Earth, leaving it a barren wasteland. King Thor confronts King Loki, Loki raising an army of skeletal Avengers, fleeing while Thor fights his undead friends. Realizing that he would never be able to defeat his brother, King Loki goes back in time to a time when Thor was at his weakest, when he lacked the power to wield Mjolnir. By moving the time-table up by only a few years, King Loki could kill Thor while still one day successfully destroying the Earth.

Loki then goes into a metaphorical space, where Old Loki and Kid Loki are, telling him that he will not be able to change his story. Verity then calls him out, telling Loki that because King Loki did not recognize her, an alternate future is already unfolding. Loki now decides to change his destiny, realizing that lies are just stories, and as god of them, he can tell a new one. He then seemingly destroys himself, sending King Loki to the now changed near-future. Eight months pass, and the sky turns red as the Secret Wars is about to begin, when Verity hears a knock on her door, with Loki standing there, claiming to be the "God of Stories".

Secret Wars
The "Last Days" part of the Secret Wars storyline picks up directly after the prior events with Verity being unsure if she can trust Loki now that he is a different person. Loki tells Verity that she is important in this end of the world event. Meanwhile, King Loki has set the Midgard Serpent free, and plans on using it to destroy Asgard. As King Loki wages war on Asgard, killing gods and cracking jokes, the younger Loki places Verity Willis's soul in a pretty glowing bracelet to protect her from being annihilated along with her physical form when the Multiverse comes to an end. Just as it seems certain that King Loki will defeat the Asgardians, Freyja sacrificed her life to destroy Jormungandr and Odin blows the fabled Gjallarhorn (the Horn of Heroes) to resurrect the dead gods, as foretold, for their final battle. To King Loki's astonishment, Loki is alive and turns up to join the legion of deceased gods in Asgard's defence. Upon being faced with Loki and all the resurrected gods, King Loki loses his nerve and flees into the ether. Loki is hailed by all as a hero. This is exactly what all previous iterations of Loki would have wanted most: attention, adoration, praise. Odin even proudly compares Loki to Thor and calls him "son", but Loki shakes off Odin's promises insisting that he is done taking "sides". Loki and Verity then survive the incursion, and chase away the gods who sit above the Multiverse, who want Loki to surrender the stories of Asgard, which he is keeping in preservation. They also discover King Loki, another survivor of the incursions, and upon explaining that he understands King Loki's motivations. King Loki breaks down in tears, and Loki places his alternate self in his sceptre as a reminder of his potential to commit great evil. Loki then explains that the universe will be reborn, and invites Verity to follow him, into a new reality by creating a door labelled 'Next', although he unsure as to whether he will change again on the other side.

Defenders
Loki ended up in the Sixth Cosmos, the iteration of the Multiverse before the one he left. There he met Taaia, hero of that world and mother of Galactus. Loki saw something on the Outside that he believed would threaten the Eighth Cosmos, the Multiverse that was brought back after the incursions. Upon realizing that Verity's ghost was not with him, he used his staff to check up on her in the Eighth Cosmos and was pleased to see her well. He then went to check up on Asgard but saw Odin's funeral, to which he expressed his remorse; however, he also saw himself in the Eighth Cosmos, despite the fact that he never died nor entered the Eighth Cosmos. He deduced that he must be time-displaced, and at some point, he would go back to the start of the Eighth Cosmos and become the Loki he saw. This angered him because he believed his "new" incarnation was a reversion of his old self, and was scared that his future would just be his past on repeat. Nevertheless, he became she and declared that she would have one more adventure before she goes back. Taaia told him she had a device that would allow her to warn Doctor Strange of this potential danger but he suggested instead that he could piggyback of this device with his magic to make a portal to the present.

Loki and Taaia of Taa went through one of her portals and ended up in Kadesh, the Blue Marvel's underwater science fortress. They were summoned along with other members of the Defenders by the then-late Doctor Strange's tarot cards possessed by Eternity, and were sent to the Neutral Zone. Eternity commanded the Defenders to find out about this mysterious threat and opened a way to the Outside. Along the way, she met the Beyonders in the Beyond; was attacked by the Phoenix Force for being time-displaced in the White Hot Room; and repaired her horn with the Eternity Mask and used it call upon the Queen of Nevers in the Land of Couldn't-Be-Shouldn't-Be. Finally, the Defenders reached the House of Ideas. Loki saw her future self look at her enter, which Loki assumed it meant her plan was going to succeed because the future Loki did not remember going to the House of Ideas. After the One Above All revealed to the Defenders a glimpse of Eternity's unknown enemy, the "Enigma" to come, Loki revealed her plan to leave the story completely through the House of Ideas. That way, she could be free to be herself without resigning to the old "status quo." The Blue Marvel told Loki about a bodhisattva vow and Loki decided to try to save everyone from their status quos. However, in order for this to work, she decided to trick herself by erasing her memories of this journey until much later.

Presidential campaign 

Following Reed Richards' interference in the multiverse's rebirth, Loki led a presidential campaign called "Vote Loki".

Sorcerer Supreme 

Taking over from Dr. Stephen Strange, Loki became the Sorcerer Supreme for a short period.

War of the Realms and the God Who Fell to Earth 

Malekith fully began The War of the Realms.

Powers and abilities
Loki is a member of the race of Frost Giants of Jotunheim, although not a giant in stature. He possesses physical attributes equal to a fit member of his race, such as, enhanced strength, stamina (their Frost Giant metabolism grants him superhuman levels of physical stamina in practically all activities), speed, durability (enough to withstand high-caliber bullets without harm) and immunity to all known diseases and toxins as well as resistance to magic and aging.

Loki possesses genius-level intelligence and has extensive training in magic, and possesses the ability to manipulate magical forces for a variety of purposes: energy projection, creation of force fields, temporarily increasing his own physical capabilities, granting superhuman abilities to living beings or inanimate objects, flight, hypnosis, illusion casting and inter-dimensional teleportation.

Loki's magical abilities have been described as equal to those of Karnilla, the most skilled sorceress of Asgard. His illusion casting can fool cities, and powerful entities such as Surtur. He has been able to break free of Celestial technology in the possession of Apocalypse.

Loki possesses extrasensory abilities and is capable of astral projection and casting his thoughts across great distances—even across dimensional barriers, like that between Asgard and Earth—even if he is unable to move. He cannot read the minds of other beings, although he can influence their actions, and once briefly hypnotized Thor, and controlled a flock of birds. However, he could not coerce Thor to give him Mjolnir. If someone has evil thoughts, Loki can influence their actions (even if they are in Asgard and the subject is on Earth), and can influence other events to some degree, such as diverting a missile from its path, or redirecting a radio signal.

Loki is an adept shapeshifter and can change into animals (examples include transmogrification to a salmon, horse, etc.) or impersonate other people, such as Thor or Captain America. However, he does not necessarily gain the abilities of whatever or whoever he turns into, although minor natural abilities such as flight in bird form tend to work. Loki may mimic the abilities of some supernatural beings if they turn into such creatures. Loki has also turned clouds into dragons, and animated trees to attack Thor. After his rebirth, his shapeshifting abilities are more limited. He explained to Lorelei that, "I can turn into anything, as long as it's me", which he demonstrates by transforming into the female Lady Loki and a lupine form.

Loki has imbued himself with magical abilities that enables him to withstand injuries that would prove fatal to another Asgardian, such as being beheaded by Balder. He has also been shown to be immune to the Controller's control disk, the mental influence of the Voice, and the power-sapping abilities of Rogue.

Loki crafted a method of cheating death, being reincarnated upon any "death" through an arrangement with the various incarnations of Death that his name be erased from the books of Hell.

Loki possesses a brilliant intellect, with some knowledge of technology, as illustrated by the time when he created a machine to amplify Iceman's powers, and when he attached devices to the Twilight sword to tap into its powers. Loki is an expert manipulator and schemer, frequently using pawns in his plans. He is sometimes armed with a sword, a whip, or a three-pronged spear and has used magical items (such as the Norn Stones) to enhance his powers.

Reception

Accolades 
 In 2013, Complex ranked Loki 12th in their "25 Greatest Comic Book Villains of All Time" list.
 In 2014, IGN ranked Loki 8th in their "The Top 100 Comic Book Villains" list.
 In 2017, Screen Rant ranked Loki 7th in their "25 Greatest Comic Book Supervillains Of All Time" list.
 In 2018, Vanity Fair included Loki in their "Stan Lee’s Most Iconic Characters" list.
 In 2019, IGN ranked Loki 4th in their "Top 25 Marvel Villains" list.
 In 2020, CBR.com ranked Loki 8th in their "10 Marvel Gods With The Highest Kill Count" list.
 in 2022, The A.V. Club ranked Loki 1st in their "28 best Marvel villains" list.
 In 2022, Newsarama ranked Loki 4th in their "Best Marvel supervillains" list.
 In 2022, CBR.com ranked Loki 5th in their "13 Most Important Marvel Villains" list.

Other versions

Avenger Prime
In an unidentified alternate reality, Loki lost his brother Thor when his attempt to tame a runaway Mjolnir sent him into the Sun. After Odin wasn't the same after that, Loki sold him into slavery to the Frost Giants. Loki sought counsel with his alternate counterparts which always ends with them attacking him. He then witnessed a fight between an alternate version of Loki who lost to Captain Carter and her team of Avengers. Then he saw other Earths who each had a Loki that was responsible for the formation of their Avengers. After returning to his reality, he had Mjolnir chained up, Captain America's frozen body sent to Jotunheim, had Tony Stark locked up, sacked Wakanda, slaughtered every human/Kree offspring, sent all the Ghost Riders to the Brimstone Mines of Muspelheim, and obliterated anyone who planned to "avenge". He found that it wasn't just Lokis that were responsible for the formation of the Avengers, it was also God Butchers, World-Eaters, and Mad Titans. He fought them off at the cost of his Earth. After attempting to throw himself into the Sun, Loki found himself in the God Quarry where he underwent a penance for not letting his world's Avengers form. Loki proceeded to build a version of Avengers Tower in the God Quarry so that he can form the Multiversal Avengers. After eons of being visited by different versions of Avengers, Loki became Avenger Prime had established the Deathloks as his soldiers where most of them were killed by the Multiversal Masters of Evil. He had worked to form ways of preventing other demises of alternate Avengers.

Avenger Prime later visited Mephisto at the time when the Avengers and the Prehistoric Avengers were fighting the Multiversal Masters of Evil as Avenger Prime states that Mephisto is going to lose. As Avenger Prime goes on the offensive, Mephisto summons the Council of Red to aid him.

Avenger Prime showed up during the fight between the Mutltiversal Avengers and the Doctor Doom variants that work for Doom Supreme. Iron Man and the Granddaughters of King Thor learn of his identity. As the fight against the Doctor Doom variants rages on, Avenger Prime summons the Winds of Watoomb from Earth-818, Earth-4559, Earth-93748, and Earth-199452 to decimate them. When the Granddaughters of King Thor ask why they should trust a Loki, he starts to explain only to feel the pain of the wound he got fighting the Council of Red. As more Doctor Doom variants show up, Avenger Prime gives a gift to the Multiversal Avengers by summoning more Avengers to help them. When Doom Supreme turns the air inside Agamotto into acid, he is confronted by Avenger Prime as Namor shows up and knocks down Doom Supreme. While Namor states to Avenger Prime that he is not a true Avenger like him, they work together to fight Doom Supreme. Avenger Prime fights Doom Supreme as Ant-Man of Earth-818 informs him about what a Celestial-sized Mephisto did to the Carol Corps' Omni-Carrier. Breaking off his fight with Doom Supreme, Avenger Prime proceeds to summon Ka-Zar who managed to bring along the Galactus of the time period that Iron Inquisitor sent him to. Additional reinforcements come in the form of Gorilla-Man, Ursa Major, and the Progenitor which has been modified with Deathlok technology as everyone makes one final push against Mephisto and Doom Supreme.

Earth-3515

Thor rules over the entire Earth with Loki as his chief adviser and head of security in a 2003 storyarc of Thor volume 2. Loki now wears Doctor Strange's Cloak of Levitation and the Eye of Agamotto. Loki releases their secret weapon, the Destroyer with the spirit of Tarene animating it, hoping to solidify their grip on Earth forever. Desak releases Tarene's spirit from the Destroyer and possesses the armor himself and attacks Thor and Loki. The siblings have words before Desak attacks again and this time kills Loki.

Earth X

In the reality of Earth-9997, Loki duped Odin into transforming Thor into a woman, saying he needed to learn humility in the form of a female. He later cast a spell on the Bifrost that if Thor would return to Asgard, he would get free rein on Earth. In this reality, Loki figured out that Asgardians are not actually gods, but are instead long-lived mutants of incredible power who are mentally mind-locked by the Celestials into believing that they are immortal, never-changing gods so that they will not evolve further as mutants and potentially become a threat to their plans for Earth in the future. He tells Odin and the others of their true origin but they refuse to believe them. In order to make them see the truth, he stabs himself in the heart and is cast into Hela's realm of the dead. He then convince them to oppose the Celestials' attack on Earth, but when fighting the Celestials, they make the Asgardians think that they are nothing and already dead, all except Loki.

Years later, Odin sent Thor to Earth as a champion to battle Loki, but Loki convinced Thor of Odin's manipulation over the Asgardians and the two team up to battle him. After Odin was defeated and Earth was safe, Thor reverted to his form of Donald Blake and Loki transformed himself into a new Thor, and with Ransak the Reject and Ahura, son of Black Bolt, they became a new incarnation of the Avengers.

Goddess of Thunder
Reality on Earth-1026, Thor has met and fallen in love with Ororo Munroe from the X-Men. Loki casts a spell on Tarene, who is insanely jealous of Ororo because she too has feelings for Thor. Maddened by Loki's spell, Tarene goes after Ororo and is killed by Thor when he steps in to protect her. With Tarene's death, her hammer goes to Ororo, making her Goddess of Thunder.

Guardians of the Galaxy
In the Guardians of the Galaxy timeline (Earth-691), Loki is alive and well in the 31st Century, living on the moon. He leads an attack on Asgard with his squad of Inhuman Assassins for Composite's sonic diffusion muzzle when he is stopped by Woden Thorson, his nephew. With the help of Talon and Aleta, they imprison Loki. Woden, Thor and Odin stand together to decide Loki's punishment and all three grasp Mjolnir and banish Loki and his Inhuman Assassin Squad to the Black Canyon.

Heroes Reborn
In the reality of Heroes Reborn, Loki set forth to return to Asgard where he finds that the Rainbow bridge is missing and, upon searching mystically, realizes that the nine worlds of Asgard are seemingly missing. He goes searching for his brother and finds him frozen in a block of ice in Norway, where he has just been discovered by archeologist Dr. Donald Blake. Loki attempts to destroy Thor then and there and finds that his magic is unable to do so. To his surprise, he found that he had been reborn in this reality. Blake showed the Avengers the frozen Thor and after they work together to free him from the ice, Loki tricked the confused Thor into battling the Avengers. Thor eventually realized his sibling's deception and watched as the Scarlet Witch banished Loki into limbo. They offered Thor a spot on the team and he accepted.

Realizing this universe had no Asgard, and as such no Odin, Loki decided a larger revenge scheme was in order, and sought out Enchantress to help him in this end. He sought to take control of the Scarlet Witch and make her his pawn. In doing so, he incapacitated her teacher Agatha Harkness, trapping her essence in a tree and had the Enchantress pose as her. The Enchantress then put the Scarlet Witch under her spell. Loki meanwhile tricked the Hulk into attacking Avengers Island, causing a breach in the gamma core there; however, an assemblage of the Avengers and Fantastic Four prevented any disaster from happening.

Realizing the foes that some people on this world had a unique energy that Loki could absorb (thereby absorbing their bodies), he sought out these beings and absorbed their power. While keeping the Avengers busy he absorbed the forms of Kang, Mantis, Baron Zemo, MODOK, Executioner, Wonder Man and others; he also tricked the Avengers Hawkeye and Hellcat to join his ranks, transferring Hellcat's essence into Scarlet Witch's body. Thor soon grew tired of the Avengers' morality on killing their foes and left the group, becoming easy prey for the Enchantress to enthrall him to joining Loki's side.

Loki soon learned that the source of the power he was absorbing came from the gamma core on Avengers Island, which was a rift in time and space that was seemingly creating villains for the Avengers to fight. He sent his minions to attack the remaining Avengers (now teamed with the true Thor of Earth-616) while he absorbed this power. When Loki absorbed the power from the gamma core, he was given untold power and grew to gigantic proportions. When Thor and Enchantress attempted to join him, he betrayed them. Realizing this betrayal, Hawkeye, Thor, Enchantress and Hellcat go over to the heroes side and Enchantress, Agatha Harkness and Scarlet Witch pool their magical powers to turn one of the Thors into a giant replica of Odin to battle Loki while the other Avengers work to build a device that will reverse Loki's newly obtained powers. Captain America goes toe-to-toe against Loki buying the others enough time to hit Loki with their power reversal cannon and allowing Thor to strike him with his hammer. The resulting combination causes Loki to suddenly disburse into the energy that he absorbed, seemingly destroying him and ending his threat.

King Loki
Throughout the Loki: Agent of Asgard series, the main villain was thought to be Loki of the past, when in reality it was revealed to be King Loki of the future, where Loki will inevitably turn evil once again. This Loki came about when, after completing his duties as Asgard's agent, he was still looked down upon as the God of Lies. After not being able to take it anymore, he stabbed Thor and proceeded to destroy the Earth, killing everyone on it. King Thor comes to seek revenge, but King Loki raises the undead Avengers to attack him. Knowing he cannot defeat his brother, King Loki retreats to the past, where he plans to kill the Odinson while he cannot wield Mjolnir. This future was ultimately avoided when the present Loki changes his fate, but King Loki is still at large.

During the "Last Days" part of the Secret Wars storyline, King Loki devises a plan that involves traveling to Hel to free a monster that will destroy Asgard. The Asgardians later gather to witness King Loki on the back of the Midgard Serpent where they believe that this will be their end. However, the real Loki appears and wards them off, just as the universe ends. As Loki is now the God of Stories, he saves a memory of the universe in the form of a story. After everything in existence is gone, Loki confronts a crying King Loki. As Loki would not be here without him, he embraces his no-longer future self. King Loki disappears, and Loki and his friend Verity await to see what the universe's next story will bring.

After the timeline is restored, it was revealed that Loki was seeking All-Black the Necrosword, the first symbiote. After killing Ego the Living Planet for the weapon, Loki stabs King Thor only to realize he himself was then stabbed by a returned Gorr.

Loki Triumphant
A 4-issue series simply titled Loki, where Loki has now claimed leadership of Asgard, and all must recognize that fact, even Thor. Finally winning the throne after a long-sought out fight is not as sweet as he thought it would be. The ones that helped him now demand their due and the favors he promised them, including the death goddess Hela and seductress Lorelei. While he goes about his kingdom, Loki continually turns to his prisoners, Thor and Sif. Sif berates Loki for being jealous of her, and of cutting off her golden hair, only to bring about a greater love between her and Thor. While Balder reminds him that they have died and gone to Hell, and while there, he saw that there are parallel dimension incarnations of Thor, Loki, and Balder; some different, yet all play the same roles. And Loki's role is never to rule. Loki then turns to Karnilla, and agrees to free Balder into her care, in exchange for her to peer into a myriad other dimensions. There Loki sees confirmation of Balder's words, all with Thor triumphant. Loki decides that Thor will indeed die at dawn by beheading. While walking out of the dungeons, he runs into Fárbauti, his birth father. Loki decides to go against fate, and spare his brother as well as free him, while Hela is revealed to be a failed illusion cast by another Loki to convince him to kill their brother. Thor decides that when breaking free from his prison, he will defeat his sibling.

Marvel 2099
In the Marvel 2099 line of series, the original Asgardians were no more but the belief in them had grown into a full-fledged religion with many followers. Seeking to take advantage of this, a corporation called "Alchemax" decided to create their own Valhalla. One of the company's scientists, Jordan Boone, decided that he wanted to have powers and snuck into the program where he became Loki but still maintained his own personality. Boone (Loki) helps Doom, Krystalin, Bloodhawk, Timothy Fitzgerald and Meanstreak fight Alchemax's versions of Thor and Heimdall. After Heimdall is defeated, Loki watches as Doom defeats Thor, gloating about his plan to pit Alchemax and heroes against each other to gain enough superpower to shapeshift out of it. He transforms into a bird and flies away.

When Loki is next seen, he appears as the villainous Halloween Jack after being tortured by Desdemona and her brother Lytton after they accuse him of cheating in their casino. Loki seeks revenge on them for turning him "into a monster" and with the help of Meanstreak, he heads to Las Vegas and finds Desdemona alone in her office. He attack her, revealing to her his true form (Loki) and hacks into her accounts planning to 'make Vegas fun again'.

Marvel Zombies
In the alternate Marvel Zombies universe, Loki is shown dead, having been eaten by the Zombie Avengers.

MC2
In the reality of Earth-982, Loki kidnaps several major superheroes including Thunderstrike (Kevin Masterson), the Stinger, Jolt, Jubilation Lee, Speedball, J2 and Mainframe after sending a fake distress call from the former Avengers mansion. He ties them up and takes them to Asgard, where he wants to use Thunderstrike's mace's powers for himself, but Kevin disrupts the spell, absorbing the mace into himself and transforming into a new Thunderstrike in the process. Loki and his army of Trolls are forced into retreat by the heroes, with help from Thor, now the King of Asgard. Thunderstrike, Stinger, J2 and Mainframe decide to stay together as the new Avengers. The adult heroes decline to stay with the reformed team because of personal reasons.

Years later, Loki is bitter about the fact that he was the cause of the Avengers' formation and wants to get his revenge. They start kidnapping heroes, holding them prisoner in life-sized crystals when Captain America, J2, Thunderstrike, Spider-Girl and Wild Thing show up through a portal they found in another universe. The heroes are quickly outnumbered by Loki's robots and they vow to end The Age of Heroes.

J2 and Spider-Girl escape but Captain America and Thunderstrike are chained and Loki plans to brainwash the heroes to send them back to Earth where they will become violent and turn against each so they will eventually destroy all the heroes. His plan is ruined by Thor when he shows up after figuring out why certain superheroes are acting so much differently. Together, Thor, Captain America, Hulk and Spider-Girl get Loki to surrender. Captain America notices a gem hanging on Loki's neck, and smashes it with his shield. Loki was using this gem to help turn the heroes evil but once the gem is destroyed, the heroes revert to normal. A furious Loki releases a deadly blast on Captain America, killing him. Thor uses his hammer and sends Loki into Limbo forever and the Hulk decides to join him to make sure that Loki remains there. After Captain America dies, Thor uses his hammer to grant Captain America's soul immortality. His soul floats into the skies, and creates a shiny new, bright star in the sky in the form of Captain America's shield, meant to always inspire the heroes and future generations to come.

In this universe, Loki has a daughter, Sylene. She seeks revenge on the Avengers especially Thor for Loki.

Mutant X
In the Mutant X universe, when Loki tampered with Iceman's powers, he left Iceman unable to touch other humans without ending their lives.

Old Man Logan
In this alternate reality, Loki is allegedly killed (while giant-size) when the Baxter Building is dropped on them. All that remains as proof is a giant skeleton.

Ultimate Marvel

Loki appears in The Ultimates 2 as the evil half-sibling of Thor.
The Ultimate version of Loki has the ability to "shuffle time and space", and in his first appearance, causes a ripple during Thor's conversation with Volstagg. In the restaurant, Loki is apparently in the background, which would mark his first "appearance" (he is mentioned and his powers apparently used, but they are only briefly seen). Loki comes to Earth after escaping from the Room Without Doors and begins to cause havoc, especially for Thor and the United States after assisting the Liberators (multinational group of superpowered villains representing Syria, China, Iran, Russia, North Korea, and France). Through his power he creates the persona for himself of "Gunnar Golmen", the head scientist of the Norwegian extension of the "European Defense Initiative", the European counterpart to The Ultimates, and turns Thor into "Thorlief", Gunnar's brother, a former mental patient who stole the technology that Gunnar created for the Initiative.

Later in the story, he confronts the captive Thor and gloats that it is all just another one of his games, and informs him that there is a traitor in the ranks of the Ultimates. When Thor requests assistance from the guards, Loki is nowhere to be seen, though he appears as a snake around Thor's neck after they leave (most likely a nod to the real Loki in Norse mythology). At the end of The Ultimates 2 #9, Loki states that the reason he joined the Liberators was because "They had a Norse god on their side. It's only fair you should get one too", and that "Odin sent his son to bring the world peace. I couldn't resist the opportunity to mess that up." However, he is hesitant to use his abilities overtly as he claims Odin will then be able to find them. Yet once all The Liberators are defeated, he decides to do things himself. After revealing to the Ultimates who he truly is, he rises into the air and change the color of the sky. At that moment—thanks to the Scarlet Witch 'calculating the odds' of someone showing up to defeat them—the sky opens and Thor, his brother, appears for revenge.

Issue 13 shows further demonstrations of his powers by attempting to trap Thor in an illusion and withstanding a direct blow from Thor's hammer uninjured, claiming it cannot hurt him. During this battle, Thor mentions that Loki's powers have weakened for an unexplained reason. After Loki summons an army of monsters to battle the Ultimates and nearly kills Thor, the thunder god then proceeds to summon allies from Asgard while he strikes Loki with his hammer, sending him back to Asgard where Odin awaits.

Loki's motivations for his actions are not completely revealed. He mentions several motivations, from a desire to cause World War III to Odin favoring Thor over him and attempting to gain Odin's favor. Throughout the whole ordeal, Loki regards humans as mere playthings for his pranks. In addition to creating a Norwegian super-soldier program that was supposedly part of an EU initiative and making people believe it was real, even though Norway is not part of the European Union, he claimed to have been the one who framed Captain America for treason and murdering Hawkeye's family, regarding the failure of humans to realize the problems with these assertions as humorous.

Loki is freed from his "punishment" in New Ultimates, playing an integral part in the re-appearance of the Defenders, now super-powered, as well the invasion of trolls to New York with the help of Amora the Enchantress. He is later revealed to be the one behind Valkyrie's powers manifesting after the invasion forces attacked America. In revenge against Thor, Loki impales Valkyrie with a sword, to which she is restored by Hela as a real Valkyrie and takes vengeance on Loki, banishing him to Hel. Loki and every other Asgardian, excluding Thor, were killed by the Children of Tomorrow (led by Reed Richards) when Asgard was destroyed.

Ultimate Comics: Thor elaborates Loki's backstory. Loki is the child of Odin and the giantess Laufey, who procreated him as part of a peace settlement between Asgard and Jotunheim. Loki was always jealous of his older brother Thor for having been given Mjolnir and rebelled against Asgard by stealing the sacred Norn Stones (relic extensions of Odin's power) and killing their half-brother Balder with their favoured bow. Banished from Asgard, Loki (going under the disguise of Nazi supervillain Baron Zemo) waged an attack on the kingdom eons later, in 1939, with a coalition army of Frost Giants and Nazi soldiers, killing every Asgardian in sight. Loki attempted a battle with Odin, only to be forced into the Room Without Doors while Asgard was destroyed. Using the Stones, Loki is later summoned by an older Nazi, Helmut Zemo (around the time The Hulk was fighting the Ultimates in Manhattan during Ultimates vol. 1). For his loyalty, Loki kills him.

In other media

Television
 Loki appears in the "Mighty Thor" segment of The Marvel Super Heroes.
 Loki appears in the Spider-Man and His Amazing Friends episode "The Vengeance of Loki", voiced by John Stephenson.
 Loki appears in The Super Hero Squad Show episode "Oh Brother!", voiced by Ted Biaselli.
 Loki appears in The Avengers: Earth's Mightiest Heroes, voiced by Graham McTavish. In the episode "Thor the Mighty", he manipulates a group of Frost Giants into attacking Asgard while Thor is on Earth, but they are all defeated by Thor while Odin banishes Loki to the Isle of Silence. After the Enchantress frees him in the episode "Masters of Evil", Loki returns in the episodes "This Hostage Earth", "The Fall of Asgard", and "A Day Unlike Any Other" to conquer Asgard and eight of the nine realms by using the Masters of Evil to invade Earth using Karnilla's Norn Stones. While the Avengers destroy the stones, they accidentally transport themselves to each of the eight realms. When Thor is captured, Loki reveals he had a hand in much of the series' events, such as the Avengers and Masters of Evil's formations, and that his initial attack and exile were part of a diversion. Eventually, Loki engages the Avengers and numerous Asgardian warriors in a final showdown, but he is defeated by Ant-Man and re-banished by Odin to a swamp-like realm where he is tortured by the Midgard Serpent.
 Loki appears in Disney XD-produced animated Marvel series, with his normal male form voiced by Troy Baker, and occasional female disguises voiced by Vanessa Marshall and Tara Strong. 
 Loki appears in Ultimate Spider-Man.
 Loki appears in Avengers Assemble. Most notably, in season four, he uses the Cabal and the Casket of Ancient Winters to take control of Earth while the Avengers and the New Avengers were unavailable. He temporarily aligns himself with the two hero groups to stop the Beyonder before betraying them after stealing Doctor Strange's Eye of Agamotto, only to be defeated by Thor and Thunderstrike.
 Loki appears in Hulk and the Agents of S.M.A.S.H.
 Loki appears in Guardians of the Galaxy.
 Loki appears in Lego Marvel Super Heroes: Maximum Overload, voiced again by Troy Baker.
 Loki appears in Marvel Disk Wars: The Avengers, voiced by Tadashi Muto in Japanese and Crispin Freeman in English. In the series' pilot episode, he and his forces imprison several superheroes and supervillains in D.I.S.K.s and spends the rest of the series working to prevent the Avengers and their allies from finding and retaking them.
 Loki appears in Marvel Super Hero Adventures: Frost Fight!, voiced again by Troy Baker.
 Loki appears in Marvel Future Avengers, voiced by Tadashi Muto in Japanese and Trevor Devall in English. He initially allies himself with the Masters of Evil, but after being betrayed and imprisoned by Kang the Conqueror, he defects and assists the Avengers in stopping Kang's plans.

Film
 Loki first appears in Hulk Vs Thor, voiced by Graham McTavish.
 A teenage version of Loki appears in Thor: Tales of Asgard, voiced by Rick Gomez.
 Loki appears in Marvel Super Heroes 4D.

Marvel Cinematic Universe 

Tom Hiddleston portrays Loki in media set in the Marvel Cinematic Universe, produced by Marvel Studios. Loki first appears in the live-action film Thor (2011) and reappears in the live-action films The Avengers (2012), Thor: The Dark World (2013), Thor: Ragnarok (2017), Avengers: Infinity War (2018), Avengers: Endgame (2019), and Ant-Man and the Wasp: Quantumania (2023). Hiddleston also filmed scenes for Avengers: Age of Ultron, but his scenes were omitted from the theatrical cut. Though Loki is killed by Thanos in Avengers: Infinity War, alternate timeline versions appear in Avengers: Endgame in scenes taking place during the events of Thor: The Dark World and The Avengers.
 Ted Allpress portrayed a young Loki in Thor.
 An alternate timeline version of Loki appears as the title character of a self-titled live-action Disney+ series.
 Additionally, a female variant of Loki using the alias Sylvie also appears in Loki, portrayed by Sophia Di Martino. Sylvie was inspired by Sylvie Lushton / Enchantress and Lady Loki, but is a different character with a different backstory from both of them.
 Alternate timeline versions of Loki appear in the Disney+ animated series What If...?.

Video games
 Loki appears as a non-player character in Marvel: Ultimate Alliance, voiced by Larry Cedar. This version is a lieutenant in Doctor Doom's Masters of Evil.
 Loki appears in Marvel Super Hero Squad, voiced again by Ted Biaselli..
 Loki appears in Marvel Super Hero Squad Online, voiced again by Ted Biaselli..
 Loki appears in Thor: God of Thunder, voiced by Tom Hiddleston.
 Loki appears as a boss and unlockable playable character in Marvel Avengers Alliance.
 Loki appears as a playable character in Marvel Avengers: Battle for Earth.
 Loki appears as a playable character in Marvel Heroes, voiced by Crispin Freeman (original form) and by Amy Pemberton (female form).
 Loki appears in Lego Marvel Super Heroes, voiced by Troy Baker.
 Loki appears as an unlockable character in Marvel Avengers Alliance Tactics.
 Loki appears as a playable character in Disney Infinity 2.0, voiced by Troy Baker.
 Loki appears as a playable character in Marvel Contest of Champions.
 Loki appears as a playable character in Marvel: Future Fight.
 Loki appears in Disney Infinity 3.0.
 Loki appears in Lego Marvel's Avengers, voiced by archival audio of Tom Hiddleston.
 Loki appears in Marvel Avengers Academy, voiced by Tom Cassell.
 Loki appears in Lego Marvel Super Heroes 2.
 Loki appears as a playable character in Marvel Ultimate Alliance 3: The Black Order, voiced by Jason Spisak. He experiments with the element ISO-8 to combat the heroes and allies himself with Hydra to take over Asgard. However, he is betrayed and imprisoned off-screen until the heroes arrive and free him so he can aid them as atonement until Odin's return to Asgard.
 Loki appeared as an outfit in Fortnite Battle Royale's "Fortnite Crew" Subscription service for July 2021.
 Loki appears in Marvel Future Revolution, voiced again by Jason Spisak.
 Loki appears in Marvel's Avengers, voiced by Travis Willingham while impersonating Thor. Additionally, an alternate timeline version of Loki appears in "The Mighty Thor" DLC.

Miscellaneous
 A four-episode motion comic titled Thor & Loki: Blood Brothers, based on the graphic novel, Loki by Robert Rodi and Esad Ribić, was released on March 28, 2011, on iTunes, Xbox Live, and the PlayStation Network.
 Loki, based on the Marvel Cinematic Universe incarnation, appears in the Marvel Universe: LIVE! stage show.

Collected editions

References

External links
 Loki at Marvel.com
 

Action film villains
Avengers (comics) characters
Characters created by Jack Kirby
Characters created by Larry Lieber
Characters created by Stan Lee
Comics characters introduced in 1949
Comics characters introduced in 1962
Fictional bisexual males
Fictional characters with superhuman durability or invulnerability
Fictional goddesses
Fictional gods
Fictional illusionists
Fictional non-binary people
Fictional pranksters
Fictional tricksters
Loki
Male characters in film
Marvel Comics Asgardians
Marvel Comics characters who are shapeshifters
Marvel Comics characters who can move at superhuman speeds
Marvel Comics characters who can teleport
Marvel Comics characters who have mental powers
Marvel Comics characters who use magic
Marvel Comics characters with accelerated healing
Marvel Comics characters with superhuman strength
Marvel Comics giants
Marvel Comics LGBT superheroes
Marvel Comics male superheroes
Marvel Comics LGBT supervillains
Marvel Comics male supervillains
Marvel Comics telekinetics
Marvel Comics telepaths
Superhero film characters
Superheroes who are adopted
Supervillains with their own comic book titles
Ultraverse
Villains in animated television series